"Live with Friends" is a song recorded by Australian singer Russell Morris and produced by Howard Gable. It was released in February 1972 and peaked at number 13 on the Australian Go-Set chart. this becoming Morris' fifth top twenty single.

Track listing
 7" Single
Side A "Live with Friends" - 3:39
Side B "Alcohol Farm" - 3:20

Charts
"Live with Friends" was released in February 1972, and peaked at number 13 for the week commencing 20 May 1972.

References

1971 songs
1972 singles
Russell Morris songs
EMI Records singles
Songs written by Russell Morris
Songs written by Brian Cadd